NGC 3619 is an unbarred lenticular galaxy located in the constellation Ursa Major. It was discovered by the astronomer William Herschel on March 18, 1790.

NGC 3619 is part of a rich galaxy cluster. It also has a relatively large amount of gas.

References

External links 
 

Ursa Major (constellation)
3619
Unbarred lenticular galaxies
034641